EMF may refer to:

Computing 
 Eclipse Modeling Framework, based on Eclipse software
 Enhanced Metafile, a Microsoft Windows image file format
 Electromagnetic Field (festival), a hacker camping festival

Music
 EMF (band), a British band
 "EMF", a bonus track on the EMF album Schubert Dip
 E.M.F. (album), a 1983 album by GG Allin

Festivals 
 English Music Festival, in Dorchester on Thames
 Electrobeach Music Festival, in Port-Barcarès, France
 Essence Music Festival, in New Orleans, Louisiana, United States

Science and medicine 
 Electromagnetic field
 Electromotive force
 Endomyocardial fibrosis

Other uses 
 E-M-F Company, an early American automobile manufacturer
 Edinburgh Marathon Festival, in Scotland
 Educational Media Foundation, an American radio network
 El Monte Flores, an Hispanic gang located in El Monte, California
 Electromagnetic Field (festival), a British hacker convention
 Electronic Music Foundation, an American music organization
 Emerging Markets Forum, an American economic organization
 Energy Modeling Forum, an American group of energy modelers
 European Maritime Force
 European Metalworkers' Federation, a trade union federation
 European Minifootball Federation
 European Mortgage Federation, an industry organization
 European Museum Forum
 Experimental Mechanized Force of the British Army